Benjamin Paul Seresin,  (born 3 November 1962) is a New Zealand  cinematographer best known for his work on Transformers: Revenge of the Fallen (2009), Unstoppable (2010), World War Z (2013), and Godzilla vs. Kong (2021). For his work on Unstoppable, he was nominated for the Satellite Award for Best Cinematography in 2010. Seresin is a member of the British Society of Cinematographers (BSC) since 2010, and the American Society of Cinematographers (ASC) since 2011.

Life and career
Ben Seresin was born Benjamin Paul Seresin to a Russian father and a New Zealand mother. At the age of 18, he moved to Australia to enter the film industry. After serving as a camera assistant for four years, he moved to the United Kingdom, where he has lived since 1992.

Seresin described his approach to his work as "detached". “As a DP, you have to learn to both trust your eye and to be brave enough to say to the director ‘This is the wrong decision’". He is the younger brother of Michael Seresin who is also a cinematographer.

Filmography

References

External links
 
 

1962 births
Living people
New Zealand cinematographers